Jean Cornilleau was a Parisian printer active in the sixteenth century. The first book he printed was Expositiones sive declarationes omnium titulorum juris tam Civilis quam canonici by Sebastian Brant, published by François Regnault.

References

Year of birth missing
Year of death missing
Printers from Paris
16th-century printers